An-Naqura (also spelled al-Nakura) is a Palestinian village in the Nablus Governorate in northern West Bank, located 10 kilometers northwest of Nablus and adjacent to the Israeli settlement of Shavei Shomron. According to the Palestinian Central Bureau of Statistics (PCBS) census, the village had a population of 1,545 in 2007. An-Naqura is administered by a ten-member village council headed by Muhammad Hashish.

Location
An Naqura is located 7.57 km northwest of Nablus. It is bordered by  Zawata to the east, Ijnisinya to the east and north,  Sabastiya to the north, Deir Sharaf to the west and south, and Beit Iba to the south.

History
Pottery sherds from the Early Bronze I, Iron Age II, late Roman, Byzantine, early Muslim and Medieval eras have been found here.

Ottoman era
It has been suggested that An-Naqura was the village named Aqbara or Aquira, in the 1596 Ottoman  tax records. It had 23 households and 5 bachelors, all Muslim.

In 1667, Anthimus mentions a Christian population in this village, though it had no church.

In 1838 Robinson noted the village as en-Nakurah in the Wady esh-Sha'ir district, west of Nablus.

In 1870, Victor Guérin noted it as a village on a hill, with 300 inhabitants, where ancient stones were used in the house-walls.

In 1882, the PEF's Survey of Western Palestine (SWP) described En Nakurah: "A small stone village on the slope of the hill. It has olives, which appear to grow half wild, and a spring
of good water, apparently perennial, in the valley to the north, near which are vegetable gardens. A small Mukam stands above the village, on the south."

British Mandate era
In the 1922 census of Palestine conducted by the British Mandate authorities, Nakura had a population of  233 Muslims, increasing in the 1931 census to 247, still all Muslims, in a total of 69 houses.

In the 1945 statistics  En Naqura had a population of 350  Muslims and a total of 5,507 dunams of land, according to an official land and population survey. Of this, 591 dunams were plantations and irrigable land, 3,444 were used for cereals, while 27 dunams were built-up land.

Jordanian era
In the wake of the 1948 Arab–Israeli War, and after the 1949 Armistice Agreements, An-Naqura came  under  Jordanian rule.

The Jordanian census of 1961 found 487 inhabitants.

Post-1967
Since the Six-Day War in 1967, An-Naqura has been held under Israeli occupation. A census recorded by the Israeli Civil Administration that same year recorded 610 persons, of whom 37 were refugees from Israel.

After the 1995 accords, 14% of village land was classified as Area A, 51% was classified as Area B, while the remaining 35% was classified as Area C. Israel has “confiscated” 680 dunums of village land for the Israeli settlement of Shavei Shomron.

References

Bibliography

  

 

 

 

Perlmann, Joel: The 1967 Census of the West Bank and Gaza Strip: A Digitized Version. Annandale-on-Hudson, N.Y.: Levy Economics Institute of Bard College. November 2011 – February 2012. [Digitized from: Israel Central Bureau of Statistics, Census of Population and Housing, 1967 Conducted in the Areas Administered by the IDF, Vols. 1–5 (1967–70), and Census of Population and Housing: East Jerusalem, Parts 1 and 2 (1968–70).]

External links
Welcome To al-Naqura
Survey of Western Palestine, Map 11:    IAA, Wikimedia commons 
 An Naqura Village profile,   Applied Research Institute–Jerusalem (ARIJ)
 al-Naqura, aerial photo, ARIJ
Development Priorities and Needs in An Naqura, ARIJ

Nablus Governorate
Villages in the West Bank
Municipalities of the State of Palestine